The  New York University School of Professional Studies ( also known as SPS ), previously known as the New York University School of Continuing Education, is one of the schools and colleges that compose New York University. Founded in 1934, the school offers undergraduate, graduate, and continuing education programs. Its main offices are located at 7 East 12th Street on the University's main campus at Washington Square Park. As of fall 2020, the school has a total enrollment of approximately 3,634 graduate students, 2,119 undergraduate students, and 11,000 continuing education students.

History

1930s-1950s 

The School of Professional Studies was established in 1934 as the Division of General Education (DGE). During the Depression year, when almost 25% of the U.S. workforce was unemployed, the DGE responded with training programs for new social workers in the Temporary Emergency Relief Association, the city's public welfare agency, and the Home Relief Bureau. As the city emerged from the Depression, DGE created the Washington Square Writing Center, the Center for Graphic Design, and began its first art workshops.

Shortly after World War II, in response to increasing demand for skills, training, and for-credit courses, DGE developed, among other new programs, a Certificate in General Education that helped veterans fulfill requirements under the G.I. Bill. DGE also formulated the Management Institute to focus on courses for business and industry.

In 1954, the school was renamed the Division of General Education and Extension Services (DGEES) to reflect the full scope of its activities. The school offered courses at 19 locations in the tri-state area. Enrollment surpassed any other individual school at NYU, and income reached $2 million for the first time. New departments were created, including the Office of Special Services to Business and Industry, and the Liberal Arts in Extension program.

1960s-1980s 

In the 1960s, the Office of Community Service Programs and the Division of Business and Management was created. New associate degree offerings in the liberal arts, business, public service, and physical therapy laid the groundwork for the future Paul McGhee Division for adult learners returning to college to earn a degree.

In 1971, the school was renamed the School of Continuing Education (SCE). New diploma programs were created in business, data processing, computer technology, and systems analysis. The Institute for Paralegal Studies was created. The General Studies Program was instituted to offer two years of instruction to college-age students. A boom in the real estate market drove rapid expansion of the Real Estate Institute.

SCE began ramping up its IT offerings in the 1970s, and in the 1980s, the school extended this growth by expanding its publishing and business programs. SCE's Master of Science in Real Estate was launched, eventually becoming the largest such program in the country.

1990s 
The 1990s witnessed rapid growth in new courses and students. SCE explored virtual and Internet-based learning, and new degree and certificate programs were created in hospitality and tourism, real estate, digital technology, and media. Following technological advances in media, the Center for Advanced Digital Applications was formed. In 1998, the school was renamed the School of Continuing and Professional Studies (SCPS).

2010s-2020s 

The school was renamed the NYU School of Professional Studies in 2014. In July 2021, Angie Kamath was appointed as the School's dean.

As of 2021, the school offers 20 graduate degree programs and 3 traditional bachelor's degrees. Through its Division of Applied Undergraduate Studies, students who cannot attend school full-time, transfer students, as well as older students who wish to return to school, can complete a bachelor's or associate degree. NYU SPS also offers continuing education courses and certificates.

Buildings
Classes are held at four locations:
 7 East 12th Street (also houses the Office of Admissions, the Office of the Dean, the Office of Noncredit Student Services in addition to the School's other administrative offices)
 The Washington Square campus in Greenwich Village
 The NYU Midtown Center at 11 West 42nd Street
 The Woolworth Building at 15 Barclay Street in downtown Manhattan

Academics
The school offers associate degree programs, bachelor's degree programs, graduate degree programs, and continuing education courses and certificates. In addition, it offers executive education programs for individuals and organizations. NYU SPS has departments and divisions in liberal arts, global affairs, publishing, business, English, hospitality, sports business and management, and real estate.

Undergraduate degrees
NYU SPS offers bachelor's degrees for students entering directly out of high school in hotel and tourism management, real estate, and sport management. Bachelor's degrees for transfer students, adult learners, active duty members of the military, and military veterans include programs in applied data analytics and visualization, applied general studies, digital communications and media, healthcare management, leadership and management, information systems management, real estate, marketing analytics, humanities and social sciences. These programs are available for those who have earned 45 transferable college credits or more.

Associate degrees can be obtained at the school in the areas of business, health administration, information systems management, and liberal arts.

Graduate degrees 
Graduate degrees are offered in the areas of Construction Management, Real Estate Development, Real Estate/ Global Affairs; Global Security, Conflict, and Cybercrime/ Event Management, Global Hospitality Management, Travel and Tourism Management/ Executive Coaching, Human Capital Analytics and Technology, Human Resources Management and Development/ Integrated Marketing, Public Relations and Corporate Communication/ Management and Systems/ Project Management/ Publishing/ Professional Writing/ Sports Business, Global Sport/ Translation & Interpreting.

Rankings and recognition 

In 2020, the NYU SPS Schack Institute of Real Estate BS in Real Estate program was ranked #3 nationwide by U.S. News & World Report Education in the category of Undergraduate Program - Real Estate.

The NYU SPS Preston Robert Tisch Institute for Global Sport MS in Sports Business was ranked #16 globally (up from #31) in the SportsBusiness Postgraduate Rankings for 2020.

The NYU SPS MS in Public Relations and Corporate Communication was named the winner of the 2021 PR Week Awards for Outstanding Education Program.

Notable faculty 
 Cameron Myler
 Jennifer Trahan

Notable alumni 
Taylor Swift
Marc Bell
Burcu Esmersoy
Vanessa O'Brien
Robin Wilson
Nastia Liukin
Mary Wilson

Conferences
The NYU School of Professional Studies hosts a range of conferences including:
 The Annual NYU International Hospitality Investment Conference
 The Annual REIT Symposium
 The Annual Conference on Capital Markets in Real Estate
 The National Symposium of Women in Real Estate
 Multiple Tax Conferences

References

External links 
NYU School of Professional Studies

Professional Studies, School of
Educational institutions established in 1934
1934 establishments in New York City
Continuing education